Govinda II (reigned 774–780 CE) was an emperor of the Rashtrakuta Empire after Krishna I. 

The eldest son of Krishna I, Govinda II left the administration to his younger brother Dhruva Dharavarsha (who was also known as Nirupama). Apart from his dedication to sensual pleasures and an invasion of Vengi and the subsequent defeat of Eastern Chalukya ruler Vishnuvardhana IV (when his father Krishna I was still the Rashtrakuta emperor), not much is known about Govinda II. It seems his younger brother Dhruva did most of the conquering, as the empire reached three times the size it was during the time of Krishna I. A Paithan copper plate inscription states that an attempt by Govinda II to regain his lost control over the empire with the help of neighboring kings of Malwa, Kanchi and Vengi failed and that Dhruva Dharavarsha brought the empire firmly under his control.

Notes

References

External links
 History of Karnataka, Mr. Arthikaje

780 deaths
Hindu monarchs
Rashtrakuta dynasty
8th-century Indian monarchs